Bill Frisell, Ron Carter, Paul Motian is the 19th album by Bill Frisell to be released on the Elektra Nonesuch label.

Background
It was released in 2006 and features performances by Frisell, Ron Carter and Paul Motian recorded on February 14–15, 2005.

An E.P. with additional tracks ("Lazy"/"Mandeville"/"Little Waltz"/"Mood") was released on iTunes.  It has since become available on Bill Frisell's official website as a download.

Reception
The AllMusic review by Thom Jurek awarded the album 3½ stars, stating, "This is a solid and unexpected surprise from a brilliantly conceived collaboration.".

Track listing
 "Eighty-One" (Miles Davis, Ron Carter) – 6:20 
 "You Are My Sunshine" (Jimmie Davis) – 5:56 
 "Worse and Worse" (Bill Frisell) – 5:16 
 "Raise Four" (Thelonious Monk) – 5:15 
 "Pretty Polly" (Traditional) – 6:56 
 "On the Street Where You Live" (Frederick Loewe) – 9:25
 "Monroe" (Frisell) – 6:05 
 "Introduction" (Paul Motian) – 4:36 
 "Misterioso" (Monk) – 6:36
 "I'm So Lonesome I Could Cry" (Hank Williams) – 7:56

Personnel
Bill Frisell – guitars
Paul Motian – drums
Ron Carter – bass

References

2006 albums
Bill Frisell albums
Nonesuch Records albums